Daniela Bianchi (born 31 January 1942) is an Italian actress, best known for her role of Bond girl Tatiana Romanova in the 1963 movie From Russia with Love. She played a Soviet cipher clerk sent to entrap agent 007, James Bond. Bianchi's father was an Italian Army colonel. She studied ballet for eight years, and later worked as a fashion model.

Acting career

Born in Rome to parents from Sirolo, Marche in Central Italy, Bianchi was the first runner-up in the 1960 Miss Universe contest, where she was also voted Miss Photogenic by the press. Her film career began in 1958. In From Russia with Love her voice was dubbed by Barbara Jefford owing to Bianchi's heavy accent.

Bianchi starred in a number of French and Italian movies after From Russia with Love, the last being Scacco internazionale in 1968. One of her later films was Operation Kid Brother (also known as OK Connery and Operation Double 007), which was a James Bond spoof filmed in English (though Bianchi was again dubbed) and starring Sean Connery's brother, Neil Connery.  Her only role in an American production was in the Dr. Kildare three-part story "Rome Will Never Leave You."

In 1970, Bianchi retired from acting to marry a Genoan shipping magnate, Alberto Cameli, with whom she has one son (Filippo Cameli).  Her husband died in 2018.

In 2012, Bianchi appeared in a small role in the documentary film We're Nothing Like James Bond.

Filmography

Film

Television

References

External links

1942 births
Living people
20th-century Italian actresses
Actresses from Rome
Italian beauty pageant winners
Italian film actresses
Miss Universe 1960 contestants
People of Lazian descent